Mbungo Casa André is a former Rwandese goalkeeper currently serving as the head coach of Rwanda Premier League side AS Kigali FC. He holds a CAF 'A' License and is a FIFA international recognized physical trainer.

Career
Mbungo played club football in Burundi as a goalkeeper for ten years before calling it a day at age 26. He turned out for three clubs; Dynamo (1984-1990), Atletico (1990-1992), and Flamengo (1992-1994) before returning to Rwanda to take up coaching.

His coaching journey at APR's junior team between 1998 and 2002. He then moved to Rwandatel until the year 2004 before joining Kiyovu SC. A move to Police F.C. (Rwanda), SEC Academy, and Sunrise kept him in Rwanda till the year 2018. 

In early 2019, Mbungo took up his first coaching role outside the Rwanda borders by joining Kenyan Premier League side AFC Leopards on an initial one-and-a-half year deal as a replacement to Marko Vasiljević. After a short four months he extended his contract by another year to mid-2021. However, he left the club after four months of that extension, in mid-December 2019.

He returned to Rwanda and joined Rayon Sports as head coach on a six-month's deal before moving to Gasogi United F.C., swapping places with DR Congo-born Guy Bukasa. 

In January 2021 he was back in Kenya to join Kenyan Premier League side Bandari F.C. to replace Kennedy Odhiambo. While at the club he was named the coach of the month in February, and August 2021. Slightly over a year later he left the club and returned to Rwanda to, for a third time after 2004 and 2014, take up a role at AS Kigali. He replaced Ugandan Mike Mutebi and within two months the club won the Rwanda Peace Cup, and Rwandan Super Cup with wins over APR.

Rwanda National team
In May 2014, the Rwanda Football Federation (Ferwafa) appointed Mbungo as the assistant coach of the Rwanda National team Amavubi ahead of 2015 Africa Cup of Nations qualification.

Honours

Club
Flamengo (Burundi)
 2nd Division Champions: 1993/94
AS Kigali (Rwanda)
 Rwanda Peace Cup Champions: 2013, 2022
 Rwanda Super Cup Champions: 2022
Police F.C. (Rwanda)
 Rwanda Peace Cup Champions: 2014
 2014 Kagame Interclub Cup Second runner-up: 2014

Individual
Bandari (Kenya)
 Kenyan Premier League Coach of the Week (3): 2020–21 Match day 12, 13, 14 (February 2021)
 Kenyan Premier League Coach of the Month (2): March 2021, August 2021

References

External links
 
 Mbungo Casa André at National-Football-Teams.com

1968 births
Living people
Expatriate football managers in Kenya
Rwanda national football team managers
Football managers in Rwanda
Rwandan football managers
Expatriate footballers in Burundi
Association football goalkeepers